Guillermo Coria was the defending champion, but did not participate.

Guillermo Cañas won the title, defeating Gastón Gaudio 5–7, 6–2, 6–0, 1–6, 6–3 in the final.

Seeds
All seeds receive a bye into the second round.

Draw

Finals

Top half

Section 1

Section 2

Bottom half

Section 3

Section 4

References

External links
 Main draw
 Qualifying draw

Stuttgart Singles
2004 Singles